Hamelin Island lies north of Cape Hamelin, just out to sea from the former Hamelin Bay Jetty, on Hamelin Bay, on the south west coast of Western Australia, about 7 km north of Cape Leeuwin.

The location of the island, and its protection of part of the anchorage from prevailing weather and winds was observed very early in the twentieth century.

Rabbits
A Western Mail (Western Australia) Christmas edition of 1930  has a photograph of the island, and calls it Rabbit Island.  Which relates to the 22 July 1911 article cited above - Leeuwin Land, which stated that:

Wrecks
The Hamelin Bay was the site of many wrecks, however less have occurred on the island. One was in December 1933 of the fishing boat Toba. In July 2016, a storm caused a lone sailor to strike rocks in the bay, causing the sailor to abandon ship on a small tender to seek shelter on the island.

Light
In 1935 the Island automatic light was planned and proposed, to assist navigators in the area of Cape Leeuwin for a successful negotiation of the journey rounding at the Leeuwin area.

The automatic light was constructed in 1937 - 1938.

The light house was re-located in 1967, to higher ground behind Cape Hamelin on the mainland.

Notes

Islands of the South West (Western Australia)
Nature reserves in Western Australia
Hamelin Bay, Western Australia
Lighthouses in Western Australia
Lighthouses completed in 1938